"Blue Jeans" (Fox Trot Song) is a sentimental popular song written by Harry D. Kerr and Lou Traveller in 1920. In the song, the singer is reminiscing about a long-ago young love that happened somewhere in the "hills of the old Cumberland." The chorus echoes the singer's longing:

"Blue Jeans" was recorded a number of times, including by the Premier Quartet (Edison Blue Amberol 4288, August 1921) and the Peerless Quartet (Victor 18740, November 1920).

References

Bibliography
Kerr, Harry D. (words); Traveller, Lou (music). "Blue Jeans: Fox Trot Song" (sheet music). Cleveland: Sam Fox Pub. Co. (1920).

External links
"A Blast From The Past; October 1997, First Issue Updated. The Parlor Songs Collection.
"Blue Jeans" (mp3) by the Premier Quartet; hosted by Internet Archive.
"Blue Jeans" (sheet music), Archive of Popular American Music; hosted by UCLA Library Digital Collections.

American popular music
1920 songs
Foxtrots